Coach America, also doing business as American Coach Lines, was a holding company for American bus services owned by New York-based private equity firm Fenway Partners operating under the Coach America, American Coach Lines, and Gray Line names (at some locations, operating under pre-existing branding). Coach America consisted of all former Coach USA operations except for the midwestern United States, New York, New Jersey, Pennsylvania, and New England, along with Lakefront Lines in Ohio (acquired separately). For the nine years of its existence, Coach America was based in Dallas, Texas.

History
The properties that became Coach America were previously owned by Scotland-based Stagecoach Group as Coach USA's Western, South Central, and Southeastern divisions. Coach America was formed in 2003 when, after Stagecoach Group evaluated its Coach USA business, it decided to retain mostly its scheduled and local transit services in the Northeast and North Central region and put the rest of the company up for sale. The South Central and West divisions of Coach USA were sold to Kohlberg & Co., LLC, with these companies continuing to use the Coach USA name for a time, but eventually changing to Coach America. The Southeast division was sold to a separate buyer, Lincolnshire Management, and became American Coach Lines.

In 2006, Coach America purchased American Coach Lines from Lincolnshire. In November of that same year, Kohlberg sold Coach America to another private equity firm, Fenway Partners. Coach America acquired the Ohio carrier Lakefront Lines in 2008.

In early 2012, following a Chapter 11 bankruptcy, the assets of Coach America were sold in units. Stagecoach repurchased eight of the Coach America properties that it had sold in the 2003 divestiture, plus Lakefront Lines/Hopkins Transportation in Ohio. Tornado Bus Company bought the El Expreso operation, Professional Transportation, Inc. purchased Coach America's rail crew division, and Transportation Management Services purchased the remainder of Coach America's operations, forming Horizon Coach Lines, except for the Los Angeles DOT contract, which was sold to MV Transportation; three Florida locations were later flipped to Academy Bus. The Dallas office closed in July 2012, ending Coach America operations.

Divisions 
Coach America was organized into several divisions:
Mountain: Based in Las Vegas with the Western Division office, this division consisted of subsidiaries based in Arkansas, Colorado, North Dakota, Tennessee, Ohio, and Wyoming.
Northwest: This division based in Sacramento consisted of companies based in northern California, northern Nevada, and Oregon.
South Central: This division based in Houston comprised companies based in Texas and Louisiana.
Southeast: This division, based in Orlando, consisted of the former American Coach Lines companies.
West: Based in Las Vegas, this division comprised subsidiaries based in Arizona, southern Nevada, and southern California.
Crew Transport: Provided transportation to the industrial sector, with operations in 15 states.

See also 

Peter Pan Bus Lines

References

External links
Coach America
American Coach Lines

American companies established in 2003
Transport companies established in 2003
Transport companies disestablished in 2012
Bus companies of the United States
Companies based in Dallas
Privately held companies based in Texas
Companies that filed for Chapter 11 bankruptcy in 2012
Transportation companies based in Texas